Bostanlar is a village in the Amasra District, Bartın Province, Turkey. Its population is 137 (2021).

History 
The village has had the same name since 1907.

Geography 
The village is 9 km from Bartın city center and 9 km from Amasra town centre.

References

Villages in Amasra District